Libkovice pod Řípem is a municipality and village in Litoměřice District in the Ústí nad Labem Region of the Czech Republic. It has about 500 inhabitants.

Etymology
The name Libkovice is probably derived from name of first family which lived in this place. Great grandfather of this family was named Ljubek, so the name of village was originally Ljubekovice.

Geography
It lies in a flat agricultural landscape of the Lower Eger Table. It is situated near Říp Mountain, which lies outside the municipal territory.

History

The first written mention of Libkovice pod Řípem is from 1351. The village was probably founded around 1000, during the rule of the Vršovci family.

Sights
The Evangelical church was built in 1852–1855. It was the first Evangelical church in the Czech Republic with a tower and bells.

References

External links

Villages in Litoměřice District